Shaykh Adnan Mohammed al-Aroor (born 1948) is a Salafi scholar from Hama, Syria.

al-Aroor appears regularly on TV stations in Saudi Arabia, including the widely watched satellite channel al-Safa, where he is known for his programs criticizing non-Salafi Islamic majorities fighting with the government. He became widely known and promoted after the start of the Syrian Revolution as the non-official face of the anti-government movement in Syria. He favors arming the Syrian opposition and a foreign military intervention.

According to The Economist: "Those who tuned in to Mr Arour's weekly show were attracted less by his Sunni triumphalism than by his theatrical appeals for all Syrians to rise and fight, something opposition intellectuals in exile neglected to do. But as Syria's misery has ground on, sectarian fault lines have inexorably widened. Mr Arour's views, once widely dismissed as extreme, now look closer to the terrorism and extremism, at least among the three-quarters of Syrians who are Sunni Muslims".  Aroor fled Syria after losing support due to extremist salafist views which promoted sectarian hatred and genocide.

Abdul Razzaq al-Mahdi, Nabil Al-Awadi, Tariq Abdelhaleem, and Hani al-Sibai who are linked to Al-Qaeda, in addition to others like Adnan al-Aroor, Abd Al-Aziz Al-Fawzan, Mohamad al-Arefe, Abdul Rahman Al-Sudais, Abdul-Aziz ibn Abdullah Al Shaykh and others were included on a death list by ISIS.

References

1948 births
Living people
Syrian television personalities
People of the Syrian civil war
Syrian Sunni clerics
People from Hama
Syrian emigrants to Saudi Arabia
Syrian Salafis